The Stake is a 1915 American silent short drama film starring William Garwood in the lead role with Violet Mersereau.

External links

1915 films
1915 drama films
Silent American drama films
American silent short films
American black-and-white films
1915 short films
1910s American films